Jacob Børretzen (August 30, 1900 – November 17, 1989) was a Norwegian hymnwriter and linguist. 

Børretzen was born in Enge in Etne, Hordaland County, Norway, the son of Vilhelm Severin Børretzen and Sigrid Børretzen. He was the secretary of Norwegian Sami Mission (since 1966 the Norges Samemisjon) and a member of the hymnal commission for the Sami hymnal Gir'ko-sál'bmagirji, which was published in 1957. He translated hymns into Sami, and is represented by a hymn he translated in the 1985 Norwegian hymnal and its supplement Salmer 1997 (1997 Hymns). He also published the volume Liten samisk grammatikk (Little Sami Grammar) in 1966.

His son was the author, illustrator, and translator Odd Børretzen.

References

Further reading
Aasmundtveit, Anne Kristin. 1995. Biografisk leksikon til Norsk Salmebok og Norsk Koralbok. Oslo: Verbum forlag. , page 128.

Norwegian hymnwriters
Linguists from Norway
1900 births
1989 deaths
People from Hordaland
People from Etne
20th-century Norwegian translators
20th-century linguists